Velu Thampi Memorial Nair Service Society College is a general degree college in Dhanuvachapuram, Thiruvananthapuram district, Kerala. It was established in 1964. The college is affiliated with Kerala University. It offers courses in arts, commerce and science.

Departments

Science

Physics
Chemistry
Mathematics
Botany
Zoology

Arts and Commerce

Oriental Language
English
History
Political Science
Economics
Physical Education
Commerce

Accreditation
The college is recognized by the University Grants Commission (UGC).

Notable alumni
 V. Madhusoodanan Nair, poet
 V. S. Sivakumar, former Minister of Kerala
 Sanal Kumar Sasidharan, film director
 Janardhanan, actor

References

External links
http://www.vtmnsscollege.ac.in

Universities and colleges in Thiruvananthapuram district
Educational institutions established in 1964
1964 establishments in Kerala
Arts and Science colleges in Kerala
Colleges affiliated to the University of Kerala